Hiyangthang is a town in Indian state of Manipur. It is located in Imphal West district.

References

Imphal West district